Andrew Charles Hudson (born 17 March 1965) is a former South African Test and ODI cricketer. The right-handed batsman played 35 Tests and 89 One Day Internationals for South Africa in the 1990s. His career spanned 16 consecutive summers, playing for both his country and his province KwaZulu-Natal / Dolphins. Andrew Hudson finished his career with 2,007 Test runs and 2,559 ODI runs.

Retirement
His final year in first-class cricket came in 2000/01.

References

External links
 

1965 births
Living people
People from Eshowe
South African people of British descent
South African cricketers
KwaZulu-Natal cricketers
South African Universities cricketers
South Africa One Day International cricketers
South Africa Test cricketers
Cricketers who made a century on Test debut
Alumni of Kearsney College
Cricketers at the 1998 Commonwealth Games
Commonwealth Games gold medallists for South Africa
Commonwealth Games medallists in cricket
Medallists at the 1998 Commonwealth Games